The Journey Home may refer to:

in literature:
The Journey Home, a 1945 novel by Zelda Popkin
The Journey Home, a 1977 book by Edward Abbey
The Journey Home: Autobiography of an American Swami, 2008 book by Radhanath Swami

in film and television:
 The Journey Home (film) a Canadian adventure film
The Journey Home, a television show on EWTN Global Catholic Network
The Journey Home, a Japanese CG-animated series produced by TMS Entertainment

in music:
The Journey Home, a 2003 album by Colin Steele
The Journey Home, a song featured in the 2005 game, Ace Combat 5: The Unsung War
The Journey Home, a 2011 album by actor-singer Mark Evans
A. R. Rahman Jai Ho Concert: The Journey Home World Tour, first concert tour of A. R. Rahman (2010-2011)
"The Journey Home", a song by A. R. Rahman from the musical Bombay Dreams
"The Journey Home", a song from the Sarah Brightman album Harem

other:
The Journey Home (game), an action-adventure game for SNES

See also
Journey Home (disambiguation)